hr4 is a German, public radio station owned and operated by the Hessischer Rundfunk (HR).

References

Radio stations in Germany
Radio stations established in 1986
1986 establishments in West Germany
Mass media in Kassel
Hessischer Rundfunk